Fairfield High School is a government-funded co-educational comprehensive secondary day school, located in Fairfield, a south-western suburb of Sydney, New South Wales, Australia.

Established in 1955 through the merge of two adjacent single-sex high schools: Fairfield Boys High School and Fairfield Girls High School, the school caters for approximately 1,100 students from Year 7 to Year 12. The school is operated by the New South Wales Department of Education.

Overview
Fairfield High School is a comprehensive local high school located in the heart of the City of Fairfield. Situated in the south western suburbs of Sydney, the school is located on the fringe of the Fairfield Central business district along The Horsley Drive. There is a large footbridge over the Horsley Drive which allows safe access over the road. On the opposite side of the road is the Fairfield Public School and many students graduate from the public school into the high school. Fairfield is one of the most densely populated suburbs in Sydney containing residents from all over the world. The community is one of the most multicultural communities in Sydney.

Fairfield High School offers a comprehensive education in a coeducational setting following the NSW curriculum. It contains an Intensive English Centre which caters for newly arrived students from overseas. The school provides for the needs of these students on entry into the Australian high school setting.

Curriculum
Fairfield High School offers a diverse range of subjects from years 7 to 12. Technological courses are offered to students in years 7 and 8, and elective subjects are offered to students in years 9 and 10. Also offered are a wide variety of extension courses.

Campus
The Fairfield High School building is also used for adult education classes through MacArthur Community College.

Extra events
Fairfield High School is an active member in the community and is the host to a variety of events such as the Mini United Nations Assembly, an annual regional event held in the school's auditorium where students participate to represent a country and debate worldwide contemporary issues, the Regional Chess Competition, weekend classes and a Gifted and Talented Art program which involves students from the neighbouring primary school.

Notable alumni
Mark Aaronsjournalist and author
Jelena DokićAustralian/Serbian tennis player
Joseph GatehauAustralian Idol finalist
Wayne MertonAustralian politician, Minister for Justice 1992-93 and an elected member for the New South Wales Legislative Assembly
Isaac Ntiamoahathlete; represented Australia at the 2012 Olympics

See also

 List of government schools in New South Wales
 Education in Australia

References

Public high schools in Sydney
Educational institutions established in 1955
1955 establishments in Australia
South Western Sydney